During the 1980s, members of the left wing of the British Conservative Party who opposed some of the more hard-line policies of Prime Minister Margaret Thatcher were often referred to by their opponents as "wets". Thatcher coined the usage in 1979–80, with the meaning of feeble, lacking hardness, or willing to compromise with the unions. The label was especially applied to senior members of her government who were nevertheless outside Thatcher's inner circle and who expressed opposition to her strict monetarist policies designed to tackle inflation, and her cuts to public spending.

Etymology
In British slang, "wet" meant weak, "inept, ineffectual, effete". Within the political context, the term was used by Thatcher's supporters as both as a noun and as an adjective to characterise people or policies which Thatcher would have considered weak or "wet".

History

United Kingdom
Hugo Young identifies the most important "inner" wets as Jim Prior, Peter Walker, and Sir Ian Gilmour, as well as Lord Carrington and Norman St John-Stevas. The "outer" wets were more fragmented and less visible. They included Francis Pym, Michael Heseltine and Lord Hailsham.

Gilmour was the most outspoken, delivering a lecture at Cambridge in February 1980 where he argued:  "In the Conservative view, economic liberalism à la Professor Hayek, because of its starkness and its failure to create a sense of community, is not a safeguard of political freedom but a threat to it."

In the 1980s Nick's Diner was started. Named in honour of Nicholas Scott, at the time a rising star of the anti-Thatcher wing of the Party, it served as a convivial meeting ground for wet MPs.

In retaliation to being labelled as "wet", Thatcher's opponents within the party began referring to her supporters as the "dries". 
Policies which came to be labelled as "dry" included foremostly reducing public spending, cutting taxes, raising interest rates, tightly controlling the money supply, and reducing the regulatory power of the state – all policies which were closely associated with Thatcher.

Outside of the Parliamentary Conservative Party, the youth sections of the Party saw increasingly bitter factional battles between "wets" and "dries". The Young Conservatives wing of the party remained in the hands of a strong "wet" and One Nation (Tory Reform Group) faction until 1989, whilst the Federation of Conservative Students remained in the hands of an alliance of libertarian and Monday Club supporters.

Australia
A similar factional identification exists in the Liberal Party of Australia, which is also a centre-right party like the Tories, and also has similar splits, but in terms of social policy between right-wing social conservatives and socially progressive Liberals.

Notable parliamentary members

Wets

 Anthony Barber
 Lord Carrington
 Kenneth Clarke
 Stephen Dorrell
 Sir Ian Gilmour
 Alan Haselhurst
 Edward Heath
 Michael Heseltine
 David Hunt
 Douglas Hurd
 David Knox
 Sir Anthony Meyer
 Jim Prior
 Francis Pym
 Nicholas Scott
 Fred Silvester
 Norman St John-Stevas
 Peter Walker
 Sir George Young

Dries

 John Biffen
 Leon Brittan
 Michael Brown
 Rhodes Boyson
 Michael Forsyth
 Ian Gow
 Neil Hamilton
 Michael Howard
 Gerald Howarth
 Geoffrey Howe
 Keith Joseph
 Nigel Lawson
 Peter Lilley
 John Nott
 Cecil Parkinson
 Michael Portillo
 John Redwood
 Nicholas Ridley
 Norman Tebbit
 Margaret Thatcher

See also
 Fundamentalists and gradualists
 List of ministers under Margaret Thatcher
 One-nation conservatism
 Red Tory
 Young Conservatives

References

Further reading
 
 

History of the Conservative Party (UK)
Political terms in the United Kingdom
Margaret Thatcher
Conservative Party (UK) factions
Conservative Party (UK) terms